Edward Allen Warren (May 2, 1818 – July 2, 1875) was a U.S. Representative from Arkansas.

Early life and education 
Edward Allen Warren was born in Greene County, Alabama, on May 2, 1818, to Robert H. Warren and Lydia A. Minter Warren. He received his early education there, and then studied law on his own. He married in October 1838, and he and his wife, Mary Elizabeth Warren, went on to have two children. In 1843, he was admitted to the bar and he began his practice in Clinton, Mississippi.

Legal and political career 
In 1845, he was elected to the Mississippi House of Representatives, serving until 1846. In 1847, Warren moved to Camden, Arkansas and opened his law practice there. In 1848, he entered Arkansas politics as a Democrat and was elected to the Arkansas House of Representatives. He served as the House Speaker in 1849. Between 1850 and 1851, Warren served as a judge on the Circuit Court of the Sixth District of Arkansas. Warren was elected as a Democrat to the Thirty-third Congress (March 4, 1853 – March 3, 1855). Warren was elected to the Thirty-fifth Congress (March 4, 1857 – March 3, 1859), representing Arkansas's 2nd congressional district.

Later life and death 
After his years of government service, Warren devoted the rest of life to his family and to his law practice. On July 2, 1875, Warren died at the residence of his son; E.A. Warren, jr., in Prescott, Nevada County, Arkansas, and was interred in Moscow Church.

Legacy 
In 1876, Warren's son, E.A. Warren Jr., opened 'The Prescott Dispatch' in Prescott, and became Prescott's Mayor in 1881.

See also 
 List of speakers of the Arkansas House of Representatives

Notes

References

External links 

 
 Edward A. Warren at The Political Graveyard
 

 

 

1818 births
1875 deaths
19th-century American lawyers
19th-century American politicians
American Freemasons
American lawyers admitted to the practice of law by reading law
Arkansas lawyers
Arkansas state court judges
Burials in Arkansas
Deaths in Arkansas
Democratic Party members of the United States House of Representatives from Arkansas
Democratic Party members of the Mississippi House of Representatives
Mississippi lawyers
People from Greene County, Alabama
People of Arkansas in the American Civil War
Speakers of the Arkansas House of Representatives
Democratic Party members of the Arkansas House of Representatives
19th-century American judges